Fenichel is a surname. Notable people with this surname include:

 Haimi Fenichel (born 1972), Israeli artist
 Lilly Fenichel (born ca. 1927), Austrian-born American painter
 Max Fenichel, Austrian photographer
 Neil Fenichel, mathematician who introduced the normally hyperbolic invariant manifold
 Otto Fenichel (1897–1946), Austrian psychoanalyst
 Sámuel Fenichel (1868–1893), Hungarian explorer